Yeşilovacık (former Hacıisaklı) is a town in Mersin Province, Turkey.

Geography

It is a part of Silifke district which in turn is a part of Mersin Province. The town is
on the  state highway. The area both east and the north is covered with pine forests. The west of the town is a wide sand beach. The population is 2773 as of 2012.

Economy

Both fishing and agriculture, especially greenhouse agriculture play important roles in the economy of Yeşilovacık. Apricots, plums, grapes and almonds are among the more important crops. Although touristic potential is great, at the moment, tourism plays only a minor role in the economy. (Only one holiday village) There is a little harbour for fishermen.

History

The ruins of Aphrodisias of Cilicia (not to be confused with the better known ancient settlement in Aydın Province) are on a cape a few kilometers east of Yeşilovacık. These ruins, now called Tisan,  date back to 7th century BC of Hellenistic age. During the last years of Seleucid Empire Aphrodisias lost its former importance. In 1210 Leo I, the king of Lesser Armenia sold this town to Knights Hospitaller. The knights renamed the city as Porto Cabalieri. However, this medieval town didn’t survive.

References and notes

Populated places in Mersin Province
Populated coastal places in Turkey
Seaside resorts in Turkey
Towns in Turkey
Tourist attractions in Mersin Province
Fishing communities in Turkey
Populated places in Silifke District